Exeter Synagogue is in Synagogue Place, Mary Arches Street within the old city of Exeter, Devon,
and is the third oldest synagogue in the United Kingdom. Originally built as a Sephardi synagogue for Dutch Jews trading in Exeter, it is now a synagogue of the Ashkenazi rite. Exeter Hebrew Congregation itself existed shortly prior to its construction.

History
The Jews in Exeter have a long history, though there is currently little evidence to support the existence of a Jewish community in Roman Exeter. The first Jew in Exeter was mentioned in 1181, and the community is believed to have owned its own burial ground and synagogue before antisemitic rulings of Exeter's Synod in 1287, which aided the expulsion of the Jews from England in 1290.

The first Jew known to have settled in Exeter in modern times was a Mr. Jacob Monis from Padua, who advertised his services in 1724 as a Hebrew and Italian teacher. He was joined by his nephew Joseph Ottolenghi, who was employed as the community's shochet. A scandal between these two, when Joseph subsequently converted to Christianity, is the subject of many useful documents which have shed light on Exeter's Jewish history.

With the accession of the Hanoverians to the throne of England, Jews of German origin settled in Exeter; and by 1757 the community had taken lease of a burial ground at Bull Meadow, just outside the city walls. On 5 November 1763, Abraham Ezekiel and Kitty Jacobs leased land in Mary Arches—via a local non-Jew, to avoid the restrictions on Jewish ownership of land—on which the present Exeter Synagogue was consecrated on 10 August 1764. A letter found in the Devon Record Office describes the consecration, in which the Torah was carried seven times around the bimah and the national anthem was sung.

The Ezekiel family continued to lead and support the local community for 75 years, and special services were held in the synagogue for events such as the coronation of George IV and the death of Prince Albert. The community dwindled throughout the nineteenth century: in 1842 there were only about thirty families, and in 1878 there were fewer than ten. For much of the late 19th to the early 20th centuries, the Synagogue was located near the entrance to overcrowded slum dwellings one of the poorest areas of central Exeter. Regular services were abandoned in 1889.

Six years later the synagogue was revived by Charles Samuels, who was the community's leader until his death in 1944. The synagogue was damaged in the Baedecker Blitz during the Second World War. Although small in numbers, the community today is spread widely over Devon, Cornwall, Somerset and Dorset and holds regular services using a variety of traditions. Exeter Hebrew Congregation still owns and maintains the Bull Meadow Jewish cemetery,

In July 2018, extreme right-wing anti-semite Tristan Morgan set fire to the synagogue in an attempt to burn it down. Morgan was found guilty of terrorism charges and sentenced to an indeterminate hospital order before his potential release can be considered by court.

Architecture
Exeter Synagogue, like most eighteenth-century synagogues, is tucked away from the main thoroughfares of the old city and is windowless, presumably as a security feature during its time of construction. The synagogue was constructed in a traditional Orthodox style, with a women's balcony, and was heavily restored throughout the 1980s. The building also currently contains room for a small cheder. Perhaps the most distinguishing feature of Exeter Synagogue (in which it resembles the synagogue in Plymouth) is its Aron Kodesh (Torah ark), a wooden structure carved to resemble marble. The ark contains a quotation from Psalms 5:8, "I will worship towards thy holy temple in fear of thee", and is believed to have been made by north German craftsmen. A building next to the synagogue which originally contained the cheder and minister's residences was demolished during the 1960s.

Major refurbishments made in 1830 uncovered vivid colours and decorations on the columns and ark of the synagogue, and in the 1980s window lighting was added in the ceiling. The wealth of colourful design in the synagogue is due to the fact that the exterior of the synagogue was subject to regulations at the time of construction, so that the most noticeable architectural features are to be found within. Replacements of wall panelling, seating, the upper galleries, and central heating all took place in 1997.

List of rabbis

Exeter's Jewish community did not maintain a full complement of religious staff for the majority of its history and after 1867 with the departure of Rabbi Myer Mendlessohn for Bristol it was served by Rabbis with very short terms, and to this day Exeter's community has no rabbi (in part due to its being affiliated with neither the Movement for Reform Judaism nor the United Synagogue), with services being led by members of the congregation and visiting rabbis. The previous rabbis were:

1795–1839: Rabbi Moses Horowitz Levy
1839–1840: Rabbi Michael Levy Green
1841–1852: Rabbi Samuel Hoffnung
1852–1853: Rabbi Berthold Aldu
1854–1867: Rabbi Myer Mendlessohn

See also
 Oldest synagogues in the United Kingdom
 Plymouth Synagogue

References

Further reading
 Kadish, Sharman, Building Jerusalem: Jewish Architecture in Britain, 1995
 Hidden Legacy Foundation, The Jews of Devon and Cornwall, 2000

External links
 
 Exeter Synagogue Archive
 Susser's Archive on the Jewry of Devon and Cornwall
 Exeter Hebrew Congregation on Jewish Communities and Records – UK (hosted by jewishgen.org).
 Susser, Bernard, The Jews of South-West England

18th-century synagogues
1763 establishments in England
Ashkenazi Jewish culture in England
Dutch-Jewish culture in the United Kingdom
Religious buildings and structures completed in 1763
Orthodox synagogues in England
Buildings and structures in Exeter
Synagogues in Devon
Sephardi Jewish culture in the United Kingdom